The National Governors Association (NGA) is an American political organization founded in 1908. The association's members are the governors of the 55 states, territories and commonwealths. Members come to the association from across the political spectrum; the NGA declares itself as nonpartisan.

The NGA serves as a public policy liaison between the state governments and the federal government. NGA provides governors and their senior staff members with services that range from representing states on Capitol Hill and at the White House when discussing federal issues to developing policy reports on state programs and hosting networking seminars for state executive branch officials. The NGA Center for Best Practices focuses on state innovations and best practices on issues that range from education and health to technology, welfare reform, and the environment. NGA also provides management and technical assistance to both new and incumbent governors.

History

In 1907, the Inland Waterways Commission thought it necessary to ask the Conference of Governors to provide both state and national views relating to practical questions dealing with natural resources utilization and management in the Progressive Era. The NGA represents the governors of the fifty U.S. states and five U.S. territories (American Samoa, Guam, the Northern Mariana Islands, Puerto Rico, and the U.S. Virgin Islands). It is funded primarily by state dues, federal grants and contracts, and private contributions.

NGA adopted a policy in 1977 formalizing its standard practice dating back to 1941: The position of NGA chair alternates yearly between Republican and Democratic governors, so that neither party can control the position for two consecutive years. The vice chair is usually of the opposite party to the chair, and generally assumes the role of NGA chair the following year. The current NGA chair is Governor Phil Murphy of New Jersey, a Democrat who previously served as Vice Chair from 2021-2022. The current vice chair is Governor Spencer Cox of Utah, a Republican.

Arkansas' Bill Clinton is, to date, the only former chair of the organization to become president of the United States. Janet Napolitano of Arizona became the first female chair in 2006.

The Association's declaration of bipartisanship has been challenged in the Twenty-First Century after incidents including hyperpartisan statements made at the White House and on air in 2014 by Louisiana governor Bobby Jindal during the Association convention .

In February 2020, then-Secretary of State Mike Pompeo warned the National Governors Association that the Chinese Communist Party (CCP) was actively attempting to influence U.S. policy through state governors and local officials. In October 2020, the United States Department of State discontinued U.S. participation in the U.S.-China Governors Forum to Promote Sub-National Cooperation due to alleged attempts by the Chinese People's Association for Friendship with Foreign Countries, a front organization for the CCP's United Front Work Department, to "malignly influence state and local leaders" in the U.S.

Chairs
Formally adopted as policy in 1977, chairs preside for a one-year term and alternate party affiliation, so the same party never serves for two terms in a row.

The following states have never produced an NGA chairperson: Alabama, Alaska, Connecticut, Hawaii, Mississippi, New Mexico, North Carolina and South Dakota; nor have any of the five territories: American Samoa, Guam, the Northern Mariana Islands, Puerto Rico, and the U.S. Virgin Islands.

See also
Council of the Federation, a similar body in Canada
National Cabinet (Australia), a similar body in Australia
Joint Ministerial Committee (UK), a similar body in the United Kingdom
National Governors Conference (Mexico), a similar organization in Mexico
Conference of Ministers-President, a similar body in Germany
United States Conference of Mayors
Republican Governors Association
Democratic Governors Association
Governors Highway Safety Association

References

External links

 

Government-related professional associations in the United States
State governors of the United States
Organizations based in Washington, D.C.
Organizations established in 1908
1908 establishments in the United States